Sergey Lozhkin (born 1951) is a Russian mathematician, Professor, Dr.Sc., a professor at the Faculty of Computer Science at the Moscow State University.

He defended the thesis «Asymptotic estimates of a high degree of accuracy for the complexity of control systems» for the degree of Doctor of Physical and Mathematical Sciences (1998).

Author of 8 books and more than 80 scientific articles.

References

Bibliography

External links
 MSU CMC
 Scientific works of Sergey Lozhkin
 Scientific works of Sergey Lozhkin

1951 births
Russian computer scientists
Russian mathematicians
Living people
Academic staff of Moscow State University
Moscow State University alumni